Fresh Radio (formerly Fresh FM) is a branding of hot adult contemporary radio stations broadcasting in Ontario, Canada, owned by Corus Entertainment.

The network was rebranded to Fresh Radio in February 2015 and was expanded to include two stations in Kingston and Peterborough.

Stations

References

External links
 Official Network Website

Corus Entertainment radio stations
Hot adult contemporary radio stations in Canada